This is a list of athletics clubs in Paraguay. It includes only clubs that compete at track and field and that are affiliated to the Federación Paraguaya de Atletismo, the governing body for athletics in Paraguay.

List of clubs

Central Department
 Club Sol de América (SOL) – Asunción
 Paraguay Marathon Club (PMC) – Asunción
 Pingui Athletic Club (PAC) – Asunción
 Universidad Autónoma de Asunción (UAA) – Asunción
 Unix Track Club (UTC) – Asunción
 Athletic Club Jorge Cabrera (ACJC)
 Olimpia Asunción (OLI)
 Club Deportivo del Puerto Sajonia (CDPS)
 Asociacion Paraguaya de Atletismo Master (ASOPAMA)
 Olimpiadas Especiales del Paraguay (OEP)
 Eladio Fernandez Running Club (EFRC)

Alto Paraná Department
 Asociación de Atletismo del Alto Paraná (AAAP) – Ciudad del Este

Guairá Department
 Villarrica Running Club (VRC) – Villarrica

Itapúa Department
 Asociacion de Atletismo de Itapúa (AAI) – Encarnación
 Miranda Ñandú Club – Capitán Miranda
 Bella Vista Running Club – Bella Vista
 Club de Atletismo de Encarnación – Encarnación

Misiones Department
 Club Atlético Águilas del Sur 15 de Mayo (CAAS) – Santa Rosa
 Asociación Misionera de Atletismo (AMA)

Paraguarí Department
 Club Atlético de Paraguarí (CAP) – Paraguarí

See also
 Sport in Paraguay
 Paraguayan Olympic Committee
 Paraguayan Athletics Federation
 Paraguayan records in athletics
 Paraguayan Athletics Championships

References

External links
 Federación Paraguaya de Atletismo Official Website

Athletics clubs
Paraguay clubs
Athletics clubs